Evening service (a worship that is held in the evening) may refer to:

Judaism 
 Maariv in Judaism

Christianity 
 Vespers, a canonical hour in Christianity
 An evening service of worship held on the Lord's Day in many Christian denominations
 A midweek evening service of worship held on Wednesday in many Christian denominations
 Evening service, a portion of the Anglican liturgy set to music by Henry Purcell and many other composers

Islam 
 Maghrib prayer in Islam